Bematistes poggei is a butterfly in the family Nymphalidae. It is found in Zambia, Angola, the Democratic Republic of the Congo, Tanzania, Sudan, Uganda, Kenya, Tanzania and Ethiopia.

Description

P. poggei Dew. (58 d). The sexes are similarly coloured and marked; the ground-colour of the upper surface is nearly black; the transverse band of the forewing is light orange-yellow, 10-15mm. in breadth, on the distal side more or less convex, towards the base out off obliquely so that its proximal boundary-line is placed almost vertically to the costal margin; its spot in cellule 2 is obliquely cut off and almost reaches the base of vein 3; in the base of cellule 3 a small rounded black spot; the transverse band reaches to the hindmargin and in cellules 1 -2 usually also to the distal margin; the median band of the hindwing is white, sharply defined and 8-10 mm. in breadth; the sharply prominent black marginal band is consequently 6-10 mm. 
in breadth; the basal area of the hindwing beneath is deep red-brown. Angola to Lake Kivu. -nelsoni Sm. only differs in having the transverse band of the forewing posteriorly (in cellules 1 a and 1 b) narrowed and irregularly incised. Congo region to Uganda.

Biology
The habitat consists of forests and riverine thickets.

The larvae feed on Adenia and Vitis species.

Subspecies
B. p. poggei (north-western and north-eastern Zambia, Angola, Democratic Republic of the Congo: Shaba, western Tanzania)
B. p. nelsoni Grose-Smith & Kirby, 1892 (north-eastern Democratic Republic of the Congo, north-western Tanzania, Sudan, Uganda, western Kenya)
B. p. ras (Ungemach, 1932) (south-western Ethiopia)

References

External links
Die Gross-Schmetterlinge der Erde 13: Die Afrikanischen Tagfalter. Plate XIII 58 d
Images representing Acraea poggei at Bold

Butterflies described in 1879
Acraeini
Butterflies of Africa
Taxa named by Hermann Dewitz